The 1951 European Rowing Championships were rowing championships held on the Mâcon regatta course on the Saône in Mâcon, France. Men competed in all seven Olympic boat classes (M1x, M2x, M2-, M2+, M4-, M4+, M8+). The regatta is notable as the first test event for international women's rowing organised by the International Rowing Federation (FISA), with four countries competing in four boat classes (W1x, W2x, W4+, W8+) over the shorter race distance of 1,000 m (men competed over 2,000 m). The purpose of the test event was to see whether women's rowing should formally become part of the FISA-organised European Rowing Championships.

Women's test event
The French rowing association (Fédération Française de Sociétés d’Aviron) organised the test event. Four countries sent teams; France, Great Britain, the Netherlands, and Denmark. The four boat classes competed in were the single scull (W1x), double scull (W2x), coxed four (W4+), and eight (W8+). There were three boats nominated for the double scull, but all countries had boats compete in the other boat classes. Great Britain came third in all four races.

The women would have their second test event in Amsterdam in 1952. There were no European Rowing Championships that year as the Olympic Games were held in Helsinki, and whenever the Olympic Games were held in Europe the European Rowing Championships would be skipped. The same four countries competed in Amsterdam in the same four boat classes.

Medal summary – men's events

References

European Rowing Championships
European Rowing Championships
Rowing
Rowing
European